Fujio (written: 正行, 藤雄, 藤夫, 不二夫, 富士雄, 冨士夫, 富士夫, 富士男, 希仁男 or ふじを, ふじお in hiragana) is a masculine Japanese given name. Notable people with the name include:

, Japanese manga artist
, Mongolian sumo wrestler
, Japanese businessman
, Japanese scientist and writer
, Japanese cyclist
, Japanese golfer
, Japanese photographer
, Japanese inventor
, Japanese businessman
, Japanese boxer
, Japanese writer
, Japanese chef
, Japanese fencer
, Japanese footballer
, Japanese artist

Surname
Kaori Fujio (born 1981), Japanese field hockey player
, Japanese politician
, Japanese footballer

Japanese-language surnames
Japanese masculine given names